Mohammad Salman (born 7 August 1981) is a Pakistani former cricketer who was a right-handed batsman and a wicketkeeper. He was brought in as a replacement for Kamran Akmal.

International
Salman made his international debut (in all formats) versus West Indies in the only T20 played at Beausejour Stadium, Gros Islet, St Lucia on 21 April 2011. His first dismissal in international cricket was the stumping of Marlon Samuels of the bowling of Saeed Ajmal.

In his debut match on 21 April 2011 versus the West Indies, he took one catch (Darren Sammy) and initiated one stumping (Marlon Samuels) and made 5 runs.

On 23 April 2011, Salman along with Hammad Azam and Junaid Khan made their one-day international debuts against West Indies in St. Lucia. Salman scored 22 runs in 3 innings with the bat and took 2 catches in 5 matches and did not bat against Ireland.

Salman only managed 4 runs in his first test and 21 runs in the second one, with 2 catches and a stumping.

References

External links
 

1981 births
Living people
Allied Bank Limited cricketers
Faisalabad cricketers
Punjab (Pakistan) cricketers
Pakistani cricketers
Pakistan Test cricketers
Pakistan One Day International cricketers
Pakistan Twenty20 International cricketers
Cricketers from Karachi
Port Qasim Authority cricketers
Sui Northern Gas Pipelines Limited cricketers
Faisalabad Wolves cricketers
Wicket-keepers